Nanke is a railway station of the Taiwan Railways Administration West Coast line located in Sinshih District, Tainan City, Taiwan.

Around the station
 National Nanke International Experimental High School
 Museum of Archaeology, Tainan Branch of National Museum of Prehistory
 Southern Taiwan Science Park
 World Vegetable Center

See also
 List of railway stations in Taiwan

References 

2010 establishments in Taiwan
Railway stations served by Taiwan Railways Administration
Railway stations in Tainan
Railway stations opened in 2010